Koonthankulam Bird Sanctuary or Kunthankulam is a  protected area declared as a sanctuary in 1994. It adjoins the tiny village of Koonthankulam in Nanguneri Taluk of Tirunelveli district, Tamil Nadu, India. It is just 38 km away from Tirunelveli (a bustling town on the banks of the Thamirabarani River).  It is composed of Koonthankulam and Kadankulam irrigation tanks, conveniently linked by tar road. This is the largest reserve for breeding water birds in South India. It is an Important Bird Area, code: IN269, criteria: A1, A4i, and has been designated as a protected Ramsar site since 2021.

Community involvement
This sanctuary is actively protected and managed by the Koonthankulam village community. The local people take a keen interest in protecting this sanctuary.

Birds coming to villagers' backyards are protected vehemently and regarded as harbingers of luck. The  guano and silt from the tanks is collected by villagers in summer and applied as fertilizer to their fields. All villagers protect the birds, their nests and fledgelings. Fallen chicks are taken care of in the rescue centre till they are able to fly on their own. The Indian festival Diwali is not celebrated here because the sound of crackers would drive away the winged visitors.

An interpretation centre, watch tower, children's park and dormitory are open for public use throughout the year.

Fauna
More than 43 species of resident and migratory water birds visit here every year. More than 100,000 migratory birds start coming by December and fly away to their northern homes by June or July after they lay and hatch eggs and the young ones mature enough to fly with the older ones.

The following migratory birds visit this area from other countries.

 Bar-headed goose, Siberia
 Common sandpiper, Siberia
 Common teal, Siberia
 Coot, central Siberia
 Green sandpiper, Siberia
 Greater flamingo, northern India
 Northern pintail, Siberia
 White stork, central Asia

See also 
List of birds of Tamil Nadu

Notes

External links 

Dinamalar video regarding Koothankulam village and bird sanctuary
Meet Bal Pandian: The Bird Man of Koonthakulam

Tirunelveli district
Bird sanctuaries of Tamil Nadu
Protected areas established in 1994
1994 establishments in Tamil Nadu
Ramsar sites in India